Jacob Goodman (September 14, 1853 – March 9, 1890) was an American major league baseball player who played for the 1877 Pittsburgh Allegheny, 1878 Milwaukee Grays and the 1882 Pittsburgh Alleghenys.

While playing in the minor leagues in 1884, Goodman was beaned by a pitch. After the head trauma, he became mentally unbalanced and suffered from palsy, ending his baseball career. He died of complications related to his injury at the age of 36, on March 6, 1890. He was Jewish.

External links
Baseball Reference

References

1853 births
1890 deaths
Baseball players from Pennsylvania
Major League Baseball first basemen
Milwaukee Grays players
Pittsburgh Alleghenys players
19th-century baseball players
Pittsburgh Allegheny players
Rockford White Stockings players
Trenton (minor league baseball) players
Lancaster Ironsides players
Trenton Trentonians players
Baltimore Monumentals (minor league) players
Jewish American baseball players
Jewish Major League Baseball players